Tonggari station is a railway station in Kŭmch'ŏl-li, Kosan county, Kangwŏn province, North Korea, on the Kangwŏn Line of the Korean State Railway.

The station, along with the rest of the former Kyŏngwŏn Line, was opened by the Japanese on 16 August 1914.

References

Railway stations in North Korea